Vagal trunk may refer to:

 Anterior vagal trunk
 Posterior vagal trunk